Maximiano Tuazon Cruz (April 4, 1923 – October 9, 2013) was a Filipino prelate of the Catholic Church.

Cruz was born in Catbalogan, Philippines, and was ordained a priest on November 30, 1947. He was appointed titular bishop to Tanudaia as well as auxiliary bishop to the Diocese of Calbayog on November 10, 1987 and ordained bishop on December 1, 1987. He was appointed bishop to the Diocese of Calbayog on December 21, 1994 and retired from diocese on January 13, 1999. He died on October 9, 2013, at age 90.

External links
Catholic-Hierarchy

20th-century Roman Catholic bishops in the Philippines
1923 births
2013 deaths
People from Catbalogan
Filipino Roman Catholic bishops